Eugene Fodor may refer to:

 Eugene Fodor (violinist) (1950–2011), American classical violinist
 Eugene Fodor (writer) (1905–1991), American writer of travel literature